A rotodynamic pump is a kinetic machine in which energy is continuously imparted to the pumped fluid by means of a rotating impeller, propeller, or rotor, in contrast to a positive displacement pump in which a fluid is moved by trapping a fixed amount of fluid and forcing the trapped volume into the pump's discharge.  Examples of rotodynamic pumps include adding kinetic energy to a fluid such as by using a centrifugal pump to increase fluid velocity or pressure.

Introduction 

A pump is a mechanical device generally used for raising liquid from a lower level to higher one. This is achieved by creating a low pressure at the inlet and high pressure at the outlet of the pump. Due to low inlet pressure, the liquid rises from where it is to be stored or supplied. However, work has to be done by a prime mover to enable it to impart mechanical energy to the liquid which ultimately converts into pressure energy.

Considering the basic principle of operation, pump can be classified into two categories:

 Positive displacement pumps.
 Non-positive displacement pumps.

Classification of pumps

Pumps are classified as follows:

Positive displacement pump

A positive displacement pump can operate by forcing a fixed volume of fluid from inlet pressure section of the pump into the discharge zone of the pump. It can be classified into two types:

 Rotary-type positive displacement pump:
 Internal gear pump
 Screw pump
 Reciprocating-type positive displacement pump:
 Piston pump
 Diaphragm Pump

Rotary-type positive displacement pump

Positive displacement rotary pump can move the fluid by using a rotating mechanism that creates a vacuum that captures and draws in the liquid. Rotary positive displacement pump can be classified into two main types:

 Gear pumps 
 Rotary vane pumps

Reciprocating-type positive displacement pump

Reciprocating pumps move the fluid using one or more oscillating pistons, plungers or membranes , while valves restrict fluid motion to the desired direction.

Pump in this category are simple with one cylinder or more. They can be either single-acting with suction during one direction of the piston motion and discharge on the other or double-acting with suction and discharge in both directions.

Non-positive displacement pump

With this pump type, the volume of the liquid delivered for each cycle depends on the resistance offered to flow. A pump produces a force on the liquid that is constant for each particular speed of the pump. Resistance in a discharge line produces a force in the opposite direction. When these forces are equal, a liquid is in a state of equilibrium and does not flow. If the outlet of a non-positive-displacement pump is completely closed, the discharge pressure will rise to the maximum for a pump operating at a maximum speed.

Centrifugal pumps

Centrifugal pumps employ centrifugal force to lift liquids from a lower level to a higher level by developing pressure. A simplest type of pump comprises an impeller fitted onto a shaft, rotating in a volute casing. Liquid is led into the centre of the impeller (known as 'eye' of the impeller), and is picked up by the vanes of the impeller and accelerated to a high velocity by the vanes of the impeller, and discharged by the centrifugal force into the casing and then out the discharge pipe. When liquid is forced away from the centre, a vacuum is created and more liquid receives energy from the vanes and gains in pressure energy and kinetic energy. Since a large amount of kinetic energy is not desirable at the impeller outlet, an arrangement is made in the design to convert the kinetic energy of the liquid to pressure energy before the liquid enters the discharge pipe.

Types of rotodynamic pumps
Rotodynamic pumps can be classified on various factors such as design, construction, applications, service etc.

 According to the types of stages:
 Single stage pumps:
 It is known as single impeller pump.
 It is simple in design and easy in maintenance.
 It is ideal for large flow rates and low pressure installations.
 Two stage pump:
 It has two impellers operating side by side.
 It is used for medium use applications. 
 Multistage Pumps:
 It has three or more impellers in series.
 They are used for high head applications.
 According to the type of case – split:
 Axial split:
 In these types of pumps the volute casing is split axially and split line at which the pump casing separates is at the shaft’s center – line. 
 They are typically mounted horizontally due to ease in installation and maintenance.
 Radial split:
 In it pump case is split radially, the volute casing split is perpendicular to shaft centre line.  
 According to the types of impeller design.
 Single suction:
 It has single suction impeller which allows fluid to enter blades only through a single opening.
 It has a simple design but the impeller has higher axial thrust imbalance due to flow coming through one side of impeller.
 Double Suction:
 It has double suction impeller which allows fluid to enter from both the sides of blades.
 They are most common types of pumps.
 According to the type of volute:
 Single volute pump:
 It is usually used for low capacity pumps, as it has small volute size.
 Small size volute casting is difficult but is good in quality.
 They have higher radial loads.
 Double volute pump:
 It has two volutes which are placed 180 degrees apart.
 It has a good capability of balancing radial loads.
 It is the most common design used.
 According to the shaft orientation:
 Horizontal Centrifugal pumps:
 Easily available.
 Easy to install, inspect, maintain and service.
 It is suitable for low pressure.
 Vertical Centrifugal pumps:
 Requires large headroom for installation, servicing and maintenance.
 It can easily withstand higher pressure loads.
 It is more expensive than horizontal pumps.

Working of a rotodynamic pump 
Centrifugal pump is the most common used pumping device in the hydraulic world. In which the water comes from the tank at the center of the impeller and exits at the top of the pump. The impeller is called the heart of the system. Which have three types 1. Open impeller , 2. Semi-open impeller, 3. Enclosed impeller, in which the enclosed impeller gives the best efficiency. Enclosed impellers have a series of backward-curved vanes fitted between the two plates. It will always stay in the water. When impeller starts to rotate, the fluid in which the impeller lies will also rotate. When fluid starts to rotate, the centrifugal force will induced in the fluid particles. Due to centrifugal force, both pressure and kinetic energy of fluid will increases. As the centrifugal force occurs in the fluid particles, at the inlet nozzle (at the suction) side the pressure will decreases. The pressure will comparatively less than the atmospheric pressure. Such low pressure will help to suck the fluid from the storage. But if the inlet nozzle (at the suction) is empty or filled with the air it will damage the impeller. The difference between pressure created at the inlet nozzle (at the suction) and the atmospheric pressure will be very less to suck the fluid from the tank. The impeller if fitted inside the casing. So the fluid has to be inside the casing. Casing will be designed such that it will give maximum pressure at the exit. In casing, the maximum diameter or space is at exit (discharge nozzle) and as we move inside the diameter will gradually decrease. Due to this, the volume of the fluid is more at the discharge nozzle, so the velocity will decrease, and as velocity and pressure both are inversely proportional the pressure will increase. And the increase in pressure is required because to overcome the resistance of the pumping system.

If the pressure at the inlet nozzle (at the suction) goes below the pressure of vapor of the fluid, air bubbles created inside the casing. This situation is very dangerous for the pump because the fluid starts to boil and form the bubbles. Those bubbles will hit the impeller and it will spoil its material. This situation is known as the cavitation. To increase the pressure at the inlet nozzle (suction) we have to decrease the section head.

Those three types of impellers have its different usages. If the fluid is more cloggy then the semi open or the open type of impeller is used. But the efficiency will decreases respectively. And also the Mechanical design of the pump is difficult. The shaft is used to connect the impeller and the motor which will transfer the rotary motion to the impeller. The fluid pressure inside the casing is very high, a proper sealing arrangement is required.

Applications
Main industries where rotodynamic pumps are used include:

 General services: Cooling water, service water, firefighting, drainage
 Agriculture: Irrigation, borehole, land drainage
 Chemical/Petrochemical: Transfer
 Construction/building services: Pressure boosting, drainage, hot water circulation, air conditioning, boiler feed
 Dairy/Brewery: Transfer, ‘wort’, ‘wash’ to fermentation
 Domestic: Hot water
 Metal manufacture: Mill scale, furnace gas rubbing, descaling
 Mining/quarrying: Coal washing, ore washing, solids transport, dewatering, water jetting
 Oil/gas production: Main oil line, tanker loading, water injection, seawater lift
 Oil/gas refining: Hydrocarbon transfer, crude oil supply, tanker loading, product pipeline, reactor charge
 Paper/pulp: Medium/low consistency stock, wood chips, liquors/condensate, stock to head box
 Power generation: Large cooling water, ash handling, flue gas desulphurisation process, condensate extraction, boiler feed 
 Sugar manufacture: Milk of lime/syrup, beet tailings, juices, whole beets
 Wastewater: Raw and settled sewage, grit laden flows, stormwater
 Water supply: Raw water extraction, supply distribution, boosting

See also
 Centrifugal pumps
 Impeller
 Shaft 
 Volute
 Suction
 Bernoulli's principle

References

External links

 http://www.pumps.org/Pump_Fundamentals/Rotodynamic.aspx
 http://shodhganga.inflibnet.ac.in/bitstream/10603/40703/8/08_chapter3.pdf
 http://nptel.ac.in/courses/Webcourse-contents/IIT-KANPUR/machine/ui/Course_home-lec33.htm
 https://www.introtopumps.com/pump-terms/rotodynamic/
 https://link.springer.com/chapter/10.1007/978-1-4613-1217-8_1
 https://www.brighthubengineering.com/fluid-mechanics-hydraulics/29394-the-basic-concept-construction-and-working-principle-of-hydraulic-pumps/
 http://www.roymech.co.uk/Related/Pumps/Centrifugal%20Pumps.html
 https://powerequipment.honda.com/pumps/pump-theory-1
 https://www.castlepumps.com/info-hub/positive-displacement-vs-centrifugal-pumps
 https://www.flowcontrolnetwork.com/piping-requirements-rotodynamic-pumps/
 http://indjst.org/index.php/indjst/article/view/100938/73724
 https://souzimport.ru/upload/files/auslegung-en-data.pdf

Pumps